Paranthrene dukei is a moth of the family Sesiidae. It is known from Zimbabwe.

References

Sesiidae
Moths described in 2008